Glycocaulis albus is a Gram-negative, aerobic, mesophilic, moderately halophilic and motile bacterium from the genus of Glycocaulis which has been isolated from saline soil which was contaminated with petroleum from the Shengli Oilfield in China.

References 

Caulobacterales
Bacteria described in 2014